Don't Let Go may refer to:

Film
 Don't Let Go (2002 film), an American independent feature film
 Don't Let Go (2019 film), an American supernatural thriller film

Literature
 Don't Let Go, a 2013 novel by Michel Bussi

Music
 Don't Let Go (Ben Sidran album), 1974
 Don't Let Go (Jerry Garcia Band album), 2001
 Don't Let Go (Isaac Hayes album), 1979, or the title song
 Don't Let Go (George Duke album), 1978
 "Don't Let Go (Love)", a 1996 song by En Vogue
 "Don't Let Go" (David Sneddon song), 2003
 "Don't Let Go" (Jesse Stone song), 1958
 "Don't Let Go" (The Rasmus song)
 "Don't Let Go" (Wang Chung song), 1984
 "Don't Let Go", a song by Bryan Adams and Sarah McLachlan from the soundtrack for the film Spirit: Stallion of the Cimarron
 "Don't Let Go", a song by Deep Purple from Rapture of the Deep
 "Don't Let Go", a song by Loverboy from Wildside
 "Don't Let Go", a song by Weezer from The Green Album
 "Don't Let Go", a song by Yo Majesty from Futuristically Speaking...Never Be Afraid
 "Don't Let Go", a song by R. Kelly from the soundtrack for the film Daddy's Little Girls